Afsaneh Mashayekhi Beschloss (born July 28, 1956) is an American economist and entrepreneur. She is the CEO of RockCreek, an investment firm that she founded in 2003. Since the firm's inception, it has invested over $15 billion in woman-owned and minority-owned firms.

Background 
Beschloss was born in Iran in 1956. Her father, Mohammad Mashayekhi, was a prominent education reformer and president of a national teacher training university during the reign of Shah Mohammad Reza Pahlavi.

Her father was initially barred from leaving the country following the overthrow of the shah during the 1979 revolution, but Mashayekhi's family came to the United States in the 1980s, settling in the Washington, D.C. area and becoming American citizens.

Education
Beschloss received a Bachelor of Arts with Honours in Economics from the University of Kent, and M.Phil. in Economics from St Antony's College, Oxford.

Career
Beschloss taught international trade and economic development at Queen Elizabeth House, Oxford University. She began her career in the United States at J.P. Morgan in corporate finance. She then moved to the World Bank, of which she became Treasurer and Chief Investment Officer. She was a member of the 1994 class of the World Economic Forum's Global Leaders for Tomorrow program.

She led the World Bank's energy investments and policy work on areas including renewable energy, power and infrastructure to reduce carbon emissions. In 1987, Beschloss also worked at Shell International Group Planning in London, and later became a managing director and partner of the Carlyle Group.

Beschloss founded the investment firm RockCreek Group in 2003. As of 2019, it managed over $14 billion in investments. The firm was an early adopter of investments based on environmental, social, and corporate governance.

In 2018, Beschloss was appointed to trustee positions at the Doris Duke Charitable Foundation and Dana–Farber Cancer Institute, as well as to the board of directors at the Center for Global Development. She co-chaired the 2018 Conference of Montreal for the International Economic Forum of the Americas. In 2019, she joined the Board of Trustees for the National Geographic Society.

She is the co-author of The Economics of Natural Gas (Oxford) and has written numerous journal articles on climate, finance, renewable energy and impact investment, published by Chatham House and The Globe and Mail, among others. She advises governments, central banks and regulatory agencies on public and financial policy.

Beschloss was chosen by the Carnegie Corporation of New York for its list of "Great Immigrants, Great Americans 2020" and has received the Institutional Investor Lifetime Achievement Award and the Robert F. Kennedy Human Rights Ripple of Hope Award.

Beschloss is a member of the Advisory Board for CNBC's 2022 Delivering Alpha Investor Summit.

Other activities
 American Red Cross, Member of the Board of Trustees (since 2013)
 World Resources Institute, Member of the Board of Trustees (since 2013)
 Institute for Advanced Study in Princeton, New Jersey, Member of the Board of Trustees (since 2015)
 Blum Center for Developing Companies at University of California, Berkeley, Member of the Board of Directors (since 2020)
 Bretton Woods Committee, Member of the Board of Directors (since 2020)
 Council on Foreign Relations, Member of the Board of Directors (since 2020)
 Georgetown University, Member of the Board of Directors (since 2020)
 PBS Foundation, Chair of the Board of Trustees (since 2020)
 Center for Development Economics at Williams College, Member of the Visiting Committee
 Colonial Williamsburg Foundation, former Member of the Board of Trustees
 Ford Foundation, former Member of the Board of Trustees and Chair of the Investment Committee
 Gavi, the Vaccine Alliance, Member of the Board
 Rockefeller Brothers Fund, Member of the Finance Committee
 Urban Institute, former Member of the Board of Trustees
 World Wide Web Foundation, former Chair of the Board

Personal life
She is married to Michael Beschloss, a presidential historian.

In 2008, she contributed $25,000 to the Obama Victory Fund, $10,000 to the Democratic National Committee and $2,300 to Obama for America.

References 

Living people
1956 births
Alumni of St Antony's College, Oxford
Trustees of the Institute for Advanced Study
World Bank Chief Economists
American chief executives of financial services companies
Iranian emigrants to the United States
21st-century American economists
American women economists
American women chief executives
American officials of the United Nations
21st-century American women
Alumni of the University of Kent